Küçüklü, Korkuteli is a village in the District of Korkuteli, Antalya Province, Turkey. As of 2019 it had a population of 392 people.

References

Villages in Korkuteli District